Harward is a surname. Notable people with the surname include:

Charles Harward (1723–1802), Anglican priest
Donald West Harward, American philosopher, author, and academic administrator
John Harward (1858–1932), British educationist and Principal of Royal College Colombo
Robert Harward, American defense contractor for Lockheed Martin
Robert Harward (MP) (d.  1534), English politician
Samuel Harward (c. 1740-1809), English printer
William Harward (d. 1589), Canon of Windsor

See also 

 Harvard (disambiguation)